Parmelee may refer to:

Parmelee (surname)
Parmelee, South Dakota
Parmelee System, a taxi company

See also
Parmalee (disambiguation)
Parmelee-Dohrmann, Los Angeles china, crystal and silver store